Innunedo is the seventh studio album by the Finnish symphonic power metal band Amberian Dawn.

Track listing

Personnel

Band members
Jukka Hoffren – bass
Joonas Pykälä-Aho – drums
Emil Pohjalainen – guitar
Tuomas Seppälä – keyboards, guitar
Päivi "Capri" Virkkunen – vocals

Crew
Jan "Örkki" Yrlund – artwork, layout, photography
Tuomas Seppälä – producer (vocals & guitars), music, recording
Emil Pohjalainen – producer (drums & guitars), recording
Jassi – producer (drums), recording
Mikko P. Mustonen – producer (vocals), co-producer, mixing (tracks: 5), recording
Päivi "Capri" Virkkunen – lyrics
Svante Forsbäck – mastering
Mikko Karmila – mixing (tracks: 1 to 4, 6 to 12)
Peero Lakanen – photography

Companies, etc.
Napalm Records – copyright, phonographic copyright
Optimal Media GmbH – manufacturer
Iron Avantgarde Publishing – publisher
Encore Music Oy – recording
Pathos Music – recording
D-studio – recording
Hyvinkää – recording
Finnvox – mixing
Chartmakers – mastering

References

Amberian Dawn albums
2015 albums